Charles Martin (6 October 1888 – 30 October 1951) was an Australian cricketer. He played 21 first-class matches for Tasmania between 1907 and 1929.

See also
 List of Tasmanian representative cricketers

References

External links
 

1888 births
1951 deaths
Australian cricketers
Tasmania cricketers
Cricketers from Launceston, Tasmania